The Patliputra - Lucknow Intercity Express is an Express train belonging to East Central Railway zone that runs between Lucknow Junction and Patliputra Junction in India. It is currently being operated with 12529/12530 train numbers on twice in a week basis.

Service

The 12529/Patliputra - Lucknow Jn SF InterCity Express has an average speed of 48 km/hr and covers 521 km in 10h 45m. The 12530/Lucknow Jn. - Patliputra SF InterCity Express has an average speed of 53 km/hr and covers 521 km in 9h 50m.

Route and halts 

The important halts of the train are:

Coach composite

The train has standard ICF rakes with max speed of 110 kmph. The train consists of 14 coaches :

 1 AC Chair Car
 1 AC III Chair Car
 6 Second Sitting
 4 General
 2 Seating cum Luggage Rake

Traction

Both trains are hauled by a Ghaziabad based WAP 7 or WAP 5 Electric Locomotive from Patliputra to Lucknow and vice versa.

See also 

 Patliputra Junction railway station
 Lucknow Junction railway station
 Patliputra - Chandigarh Superfast Express

Schedule

External links 

 12529/Patliputra - Lucknow Jn SF InterCity Express
 12530/Lucknow Jn. - Patliputra SF InterCity Express

References 

Transport in Patna
Passenger trains originating from Lucknow
Intercity Express (Indian Railways) trains
Rail transport in Bihar
Railway services introduced in 2016